Lightning Creek may refer to:

Lightning Creek (British Columbia)
Lightning Creek (Oklahoma)
Lightning Creek (South Dakota)
Lightning Creek (Wyoming)